Luton West is a former United Kingdom Parliamentary constituency. It was created in 1974 partly from the abolished Luton constituency and partly from the County Constituency of South Bedfordshire. It was abolished in 1983 when it was largely absorbed into the new County Constituency of Luton North.

Boundaries
The County Borough of Luton wards of Dallow, Icknield, Leagrave, Lewsey, Limbury, and Sundon Park.

Formed for the February 1974 general election primarily from the Leagrave and Limbury wards of the County Borough, previously part of the County Constituency of South Bedfordshire.  Remaining wards were previously part of the abolished Borough Constituency of Luton.

Abolished for the 1983 general election when it was largely absorbed into the new County Constituency of North Luton, with the exception of southernmost-parts, including Dallow ward, which were included in the new Borough Constituency of Luton South.

Members of Parliament

Elections

See also
List of former United Kingdom Parliament constituencies

References

Parliamentary constituencies in Bedfordshire (historic)
Constituencies of the Parliament of the United Kingdom established in 1974
Constituencies of the Parliament of the United Kingdom disestablished in 1983
Politics of Luton